Binter Mediterráneo Flight 8261 (Registration EC-FBC), on 29 August 2001, crash-landed next to the N-340 highway, some 200 metres short of runway 32 at Ruiz Picasso International Airport at Málaga, Spain. The captain reported a fire in the aircraft's port engine to Málaga Air Traffic Control while on its final approach. The fire turned out to be a false alarm but, in following the emergency procedures, the First Officer inadvertently shut down both of the aircraft's engines. The plane descended, hitting the airport approach lights, and stopping next to the N-340.

Four of the 47 people on board were killed, including the captain. The aircraft was scrapped.

Take-off and flight
Binter Mediterráneo Flight 8261 took off at the Melilla Airport at 09:37 CEST on 29 August 2001, with 47 people on board (44 passengers and 3 crew). The weather was fine.

Attempted landing
During the approach to runway 32 at Málaga, a warning light in the cockpit indicated a fire in the port engine. In fact, it was a false alarm, possibly caused by moisture and/or dirt in the circuitry, though the crew did not know this. The captain continued the approach, while the co-pilot followed the emergency procedure for an engine fire. In the process, he erroneously activated the fire-handles for the right engine as well as the left, causing them both to stop. The plane landed some  short of the runway threshold and came to rest against the embankment of the N-340 motorway. The pilot did not communicate any information about the emergency in progress to the cabin crew, and consequently passengers were not instructed to assume the brace position prior to impact.

Three passengers plus the pilot were killed in the accident.

Causes
While the co-pilot's incorrect execution of the emergency procedure was the primary cause of the accident, the investigators learnt that he had not received any simulator training in emergency procedures from the airline.

The investigation also considered that incomplete adherence to relevant maintenance procedures was the most likely reason for the false fire alarm.

Remains of plane

The remains of the plane were taken to the CASA Sevilla factory, for an investigation. Following completion of the investigation, the aircraft was scrapped.

Notes

References

External links 

 Final report (Archive) – Civil Aviation Accident and Incident Investigation Commission 
 Reconstrucción del accidente (Archive) El País. – Posted at UNAV 
 Esparza, Cristina S. "4 muertos al estrellarse un avión que iba a ser retirado del servicio." (Archive) El Mundo. Thursday, 30 August 2001. 

Aviation accidents and incidents in 2001
Aviation accidents and incidents in Spain
Accidents and incidents involving the CASA CN-235
2001 in Spain
2001 disasters in Spain
August 2001 events in Europe
Airliner accidents and incidents caused by wrong engine shutdown